The 2019 Europe Top 16 Cup (also referred to as the 2019 CCB Europe Top 16 Cup for sponsorship reasons) was a table tennis competition held from 2–3 February in Montreux, Switzerland, organised under the authority of the European Table Tennis Union (ETTU). It was the 48th edition of the event, and the fourth time that it had been held in Switzerland.

Events were held in men's singles and women's singles, and the three medallists in each event qualified for the 2019 Men's and Women's World Cups.

Medallists

Qualification

In total, 16 players qualified for both the men's and women's singles:

 The current European Champion
 The 14 highest-ranked players in December 2018, excluding the European Champion
 A host association representative

A maximum of two players from each association could qualify.

Men's singles

Seeding

Players were seeded according to the European ranking for February 2019.

Draw

Women's singles

Seeding

Players were seeded according to the European ranking for February 2019.

Draw

See also

2019 ITTF-ATTU Asian Cup
2019 ITTF Pan-America Cup
2019 ITTF-Oceania Cup

References

External links

Official website
ITTF website

Europe Top 16 Cup
Europe Top 16 Cup
Europe Top 16 Cup
Table tennis competitions in Switzerland
International sports competitions hosted by Switzerland
Sport in Montreux
Europe Top 16 Cup